Antony Raju is an Indian politician and Minister for Road Transport, Motor Vehicles, Water Transport, Government of Kerala. He is the leader of Janadhipathya Kerala Congress. He was elected to the Kerala legislative assembly from Thiruvananthapuram Constituency of Kerala in 2021. Earlier he was the MLA of Thiruvananthapuram West Constituency from 1996 to 2001.

Early life and education 

Raju was born on 18 November 1954 in Poonthura, Trivandrum. He had his early education at the St. Thomas School Poonthura, Trivandrum, and completed his schooling at the Rajagiri School, Kalamassery, Ernakulam.
He completed his pre-degree from St.Xavier's College, Thumba, Thiruvananthapuram.

Political career 

In 1996, Antony Raju was KC(J) candidate and  contested for LDF. It was Antony's first political victory in Assembly Election from Trivandrum West Constituency. However, in the 2016 elections he contested as Janadhipathya Kerala Congress candidate but lost to VS Sivakumar. But in the 2021 elections, he defeated VS Sivakumar by more than 8000 votes.

References

External links
 Chandy Faces Heat Over Kasturirangan Report

Living people
1954 births
Malayali politicians
Members of the Kerala Legislative Assembly